Epsilon is a ROPAX ferry operated by Irish Ferries. The vessel operates between Dublin, Holyhead and Cherbourg.

History
The Cartour Epsilon was delivered in 2011 to Sicilian ferry operator Caronte & Tourist.

Irish Ferries
In 2013, the Epsilon was chartered to Irish Ferries to expand their Dublin–Holyhead route, crossing the route twice a day from Tuesday to Saturday, opposite the Stena Superfast X, before running Dublin–Cherbourg from Saturday and returning to Dublin.

On 11 February 2016, Epsilon sustained damage to her cargo, after sailing into Storm Imogen while en route from Cherbourg to Dublin. Afloat.ie reported that the ship met steady forecasted wind speeds of 60 knots, with gusts of up to 105 knots (almost 200 km/h) at times.

References

Ships built in Italy
Ferries of the Republic of Ireland
2011 ships
Ro-ro ships
Ships built by Cantiere Navale Visentini